SK Sparta may refer to:

SK Sparta Krč, Czech sports club
SK Bergen Sparta, Norwegian sports club